Sizwe Zakho is a South African born music producer, he is known for producing artists like Rebecca Malope, Israel Mosehla and worked with a whole host of other gospel. He also traveled around the continent of Africa hosting workshops on gospel music. Zakho's distinct style of producing has seen a massive turn around in the South African gospel scene in such a way that many upcoming musicians aspired to work with him.

References

South African record producers
Living people
Year of birth missing (living people)